Graeme Shankland, (1917–1984), was an English town planner active in the 1960s. With Oliver Cox he established the partnership Shankland, Cox and Associates which under took commissions from Harold Wilson's Labour government. He played a principal role in drawing up the modernisation plans for Hook, Hart in Hampshire. However, local opposition successfully thwarted these plans.

Early life
Graeme was born on 31 January, 1917 in Merseyside. His father, Ernest Shankland, was the Assistant Marine Surveyor for the Mersey Docks and Harbour Company. His mother was Violet Cooper (née Lindsay). The family moved to London in 1923. His father was appointed Chief Harbour Master at the Port of London in 1926. He attended Stowe School followed by Queens' College, Cambridge, graduating in Architecture and Design in 1940. During this period he attended lectures by Nikolaus Pevsner and developed an interest in William Morris. He had already developed an interest in town planning and joined William Holford in a team designing hostels for factory workers. In 1942 he joined the Royal Engineers and the Communist Party. Having seen active service in Africa, the Middle East and Malaya he was demobbed in 1946.

References

1917 births
1984 deaths
English urban planners
Alumni of Queens' College, Cambridge
People educated at Stowe School